The 1937 VFL season was the 41st season of the Victorian Football League (VFL), the highest level senior Australian rules football competition in Victoria. The season featured twelve clubs, ran from 24 April until 25 September, and comprised an 18-game home-and-away season followed by a finals series featuring the top four clubs.

The premiership was won by the Geelong Football Club for the third time, after it defeated  by 32 points in the 1937 VFL Grand Final.

Premiership season
In 1937, the VFL competition consisted of twelve teams of 18 on-the-field players each, plus one substitute player, known as the 19th man. A player could be substituted for any reason; however, once substituted, a player could not return to the field of play under any circumstances.

Teams played each other in a home-and-away season of 18 rounds; matches 12 to 18 were the "home-and-way reverse" of matches 1 to 7.

Once the 18 round home-and-away season had finished, the 1937 VFL Premiers were determined by the specific format and conventions of the Page–McIntyre system.

Round 1

|- bgcolor="#CCCCFF"
| Home team
| Home team score
| Away team
| Away team score
| Venue
| Crowd
| Date
|- bgcolor="#FFFFFF"
| 
| 14.8 (92)
| 
| 9.12 (66)
| MCG
| 19,726
| 24 April 1937
|- bgcolor="#FFFFFF"
| 
| 15.16 (106)
| 
| 13.12 (90)
| Victoria Park
| 21,000
| 24 April 1937
|- bgcolor="#FFFFFF"
| 
| 18.21 (129)
| 
| 7.17 (59)
| Princes Park
| 33,000
| 24 April 1937
|- bgcolor="#FFFFFF"
| 
| 9.22 (76)
| 
| 11.12 (78)
| Arden Street Oval
| 11,000
| 24 April 1937
|- bgcolor="#FFFFFF"
| 
| 12.16 (88)
| 
| 10.21 (81)
| Junction Oval
| 23,000
| 24 April 1937
|- bgcolor="#FFFFFF"
| 
| 9.17 (71)
| 
| 9.13 (67)
| Western Oval
| 18,000
| 24 April 1937

Round 2

|- bgcolor="#CCCCFF"
| Home team
| Home team score
| Away team
| Away team score
| Venue
| Crowd
| Date
|- bgcolor="#FFFFFF"
| 
| 14.15 (99)
| 
| 15.22 (112)
| Glenferrie Oval
| 16,000
| 1 May 1937
|- bgcolor="#FFFFFF"
| 
| 9.11 (65)
| 
| 10.7 (67)
| Brunswick Street Oval
| 16,000
| 1 May 1937
|- bgcolor="#FFFFFF"
| 
| 13.7 (85)
| 
| 25.20 (170)
| Windy Hill
| 14,000
| 1 May 1937
|- bgcolor="#FFFFFF"
| 
| 17.15 (117)
| 
| 12.11 (83)
| Punt Road Oval
| 16,000
| 1 May 1937
|- bgcolor="#FFFFFF"
| 
| 11.19 (85)
| 
| 20.20 (140)
| Lake Oval
| 25,000
| 1 May 1937
|- bgcolor="#FFFFFF"
| 
| 8.12 (60)
| 
| 6.13 (49)
| Corio Oval
| 13,600
| 1 May 1937

Round 3

|- bgcolor="#CCCCFF"
| Home team
| Home team score
| Away team
| Away team score
| Venue
| Crowd
| Date
|- bgcolor="#FFFFFF"
| 
| 6.10 (46)
| 
| 7.9 (51)
| Western Oval
| 13,000
| 8 May 1937
|- bgcolor="#FFFFFF"
| 
| 15.15 (105)
| 
| 9.15 (69)
| Brunswick Street Oval
| 9,000
| 8 May 1937
|- bgcolor="#FFFFFF"
| 
| 18.13 (121)
| 
| 14.20 (104)
| Windy Hill
| 11,000
| 8 May 1937
|- bgcolor="#FFFFFF"
| 
| 11.15 (81)
| 
| 11.15 (81)
| Lake Oval
| 16,000
| 8 May 1937
|- bgcolor="#FFFFFF"
| 
| 3.16 (34)
| 
| 9.14 (68)
| Arden Street Oval
| 11,000
| 8 May 1937
|- bgcolor="#FFFFFF"
| 
| 15.17 (107)
| 
| 10.11 (71)
| MCG
| 31,831
| 8 May 1937

Round 4

|- bgcolor="#CCCCFF"
| Home team
| Home team score
| Away team
| Away team score
| Venue
| Crowd
| Date
|- bgcolor="#FFFFFF"
| 
| 12.20 (92)
| 
| 7.11 (53)
| Corio Oval
| 11,500
| 15 May 1937
|- bgcolor="#FFFFFF"
| 
| 16.14 (110)
| 
| 11.11 (77)
| Victoria Park
| 14,500
| 15 May 1937
|- bgcolor="#FFFFFF"
| 
| 10.12 (72)
| 
| 10.14 (74)
| Princes Park
| 14,000
| 15 May 1937
|- bgcolor="#FFFFFF"
| 
| 12.18 (90)
| 
| 12.23 (95)
| Junction Oval
| 25,000
| 15 May 1937
|- bgcolor="#FFFFFF"
| 
| 17.10 (112)
| 
| 12.12 (84)
| Punt Road Oval
| 18,000
| 15 May 1937
|- bgcolor="#FFFFFF"
| 
| 11.15 (81)
| 
| 16.13 (109)
| Glenferrie Oval
| 10,000
| 15 May 1937

Round 5

|- bgcolor="#CCCCFF"
| Home team
| Home team score
| Away team
| Away team score
| Venue
| Crowd
| Date
|- bgcolor="#FFFFFF"
| 
| 21.23 (149)
| 
| 7.11 (53)
| Corio Oval
| 7,300
| 22 May 1937
|- bgcolor="#FFFFFF"
| 
| 18.23 (131)
| 
| 14.4 (88)
| Western Oval
| 14,000
| 22 May 1937
|- bgcolor="#FFFFFF"
| 
| 11.16 (82)
| 
| 7.18 (60)
| Brunswick Street Oval
| 14,000
| 22 May 1937
|- bgcolor="#FFFFFF"
| 
| 8.15 (63)
| 
| 17.13 (115)
| Windy Hill
| 15,000
| 22 May 1937
|- bgcolor="#FFFFFF"
| 
| 13.23 (101)
| 
| 11.10 (76)
| MCG
| 44,623
| 22 May 1937
|- bgcolor="#FFFFFF"
| 
| 12.19 (91)
| 
| 13.16 (94)
| Junction Oval
| 18,000
| 22 May 1937

Round 6

|- bgcolor="#CCCCFF"
| Home team
| Home team score
| Away team
| Away team score
| Venue
| Crowd
| Date
|- bgcolor="#FFFFFF"
| 
| 13.8 (86)
| 
| 15.13 (103)
| Arden Street Oval
| 15,000
| 29 May 1937
|- bgcolor="#FFFFFF"
| 
| 8.8 (56)
| 
| 11.12 (78)
| Western Oval
| 17,000
| 29 May 1937
|- bgcolor="#FFFFFF"
| 
| 15.11 (101)
| 
| 13.20 (98)
| Lake Oval
| 10,000
| 29 May 1937
|- bgcolor="#FFFFFF"
| 
| 15.19 (109)
| 
| 12.6 (78)
| Punt Road Oval
| 17,000
| 29 May 1937
|- bgcolor="#FFFFFF"
| 
| 11.9 (75)
| 
| 8.18 (66)
| Brunswick Street Oval
| 14,000
| 29 May 1937
|- bgcolor="#FFFFFF"
| 
| 11.16 (82)
| 
| 8.7 (55)
| Victoria Park
| 24,000
| 29 May 1937

Round 7

|- bgcolor="#CCCCFF"
| Home team
| Home team score
| Away team
| Away team score
| Venue
| Crowd
| Date
|- bgcolor="#FFFFFF"
| 
| 25.16 (166)
| 
| 5.14 (44)
| MCG
| 12,906
| 5 June 1937
|- bgcolor="#FFFFFF"
| 
| 9.6 (60)
| 
| 8.10 (58)
| Glenferrie Oval
| 10,000
| 5 June 1937
|- bgcolor="#FFFFFF"
| 
| 16.12 (108)
| 
| 11.10 (76)
| Windy Hill
| 12,000
| 5 June 1937
|- bgcolor="#FFFFFF"
| 
| 19.12 (126)
| 
| 9.10 (64)
| Princes Park
| 12,500
| 5 June 1937
|- bgcolor="#FFFFFF"
| 
| 16.19 (115)
| 
| 10.10 (70)
| Corio Oval
| 8,000
| 5 June 1937
|- bgcolor="#FFFFFF"
| 
| 12.15 (87)
| 
| 9.15 (69)
| Junction Oval
| 28,000
| 5 June 1937

Round 8

|- bgcolor="#CCCCFF"
| Home team
| Home team score
| Away team
| Away team score
| Venue
| Crowd
| Date
|- bgcolor="#FFFFFF"
| 
| 16.13 (109)
| 
| 11.15 (81)
| Corio Oval
| 12,600
| 12 June 1937
|- bgcolor="#FFFFFF"
| 
| 13.11 (89)
| 
| 19.14 (128)
| Windy Hill
| 13,000
| 12 June 1937
|- bgcolor="#FFFFFF"
| 
| 14.24 (108)
| 
| 13.19 (97)
| Punt Road Oval
| 27,000
| 12 June 1937
|- bgcolor="#FFFFFF"
| 
| 12.10 (82)
| 
| 15.15 (105)
| Glenferrie Oval
| 18,000
| 14 June 1937
|- bgcolor="#FFFFFF"
| 
| 14.15 (99)
| 
| 8.14 (62)
| Brunswick Street Oval
| 20,000
| 14 June 1937
|- bgcolor="#FFFFFF"
| 
| 16.18 (114)
| 
| 10.10 (70)
| Lake Oval
| 16,000
| 14 June 1937

Round 9

|- bgcolor="#CCCCFF"
| Home team
| Home team score
| Away team
| Away team score
| Venue
| Crowd
| Date
|- bgcolor="#FFFFFF"
| 
| 12.16 (88)
| 
| 11.11 (77)
| Arden Street Oval
| 10,000
| 19 June 1937
|- bgcolor="#FFFFFF"
| 
| 10.8 (68)
| 
| 18.11 (119)
| Western Oval
| 12,000
| 19 June 1937
|- bgcolor="#FFFFFF"
| 
| 16.9 (105)
| 
| 12.12 (84)
| Victoria Park
| 18,000
| 19 June 1937
|- bgcolor="#FFFFFF"
| 
| 15.24 (114)
| 
| 8.11 (59)
| Princes Park
| 11,000
| 19 June 1937
|- bgcolor="#FFFFFF"
| 
| 9.17 (71)
| 
| 15.14 (104)
| MCG
| 29,376
| 19 June 1937
|- bgcolor="#FFFFFF"
| 
| 13.19 (97)
| 
| 11.14 (80)
| Junction Oval
| 14,000
| 19 June 1937

Round 10

|- bgcolor="#CCCCFF"
| Home team
| Home team score
| Away team
| Away team score
| Venue
| Crowd
| Date
|- bgcolor="#FFFFFF"
| 
| 18.16 (124)
| 
| 4.14 (38)
| Corio Oval
| 9,000
| 26 June 1937
|- bgcolor="#FFFFFF"
| 
| 7.8 (50)
| 
| 11.23 (89)
| Brunswick Street Oval
| 16,000
| 26 June 1937
|- bgcolor="#FFFFFF"
| 
| 14.18 (102)
| 
| 8.12 (60)
| Lake Oval
| 22,000
| 26 June 1937
|- bgcolor="#FFFFFF"
| 
| 15.16 (106)
| 
| 14.15 (99)
| Glenferrie Oval
| 7,500
| 26 June 1937
|- bgcolor="#FFFFFF"
| 
| 12.8 (80)
| 
| 14.9 (93)
| Punt Road Oval
| 22,000
| 26 June 1937
|- bgcolor="#FFFFFF"
| 
| 13.18 (96)
| 
| 15.18 (108)
| Windy Hill
| 14,000
| 26 June 1937

Round 11

|- bgcolor="#CCCCFF"
| Home team
| Home team score
| Away team
| Away team score
| Venue
| Crowd
| Date
|- bgcolor="#FFFFFF"
| 
| 13.10 (88)
| 
| 11.16 (82)
| MCG
| 20,638
| 3 July 1937
|- bgcolor="#FFFFFF"
| 
| 11.8 (74)
| 
| 13.15 (93)
| Western Oval
| 5,500
| 3 July 1937
|- bgcolor="#FFFFFF"
| 
| 13.23 (101)
| 
| 6.13 (49)
| Victoria Park
| 5,800
| 3 July 1937
|- bgcolor="#FFFFFF"
| 
| 13.11 (89)
| 
| 8.19 (67)
| Princes Park
| 8,000
| 3 July 1937
|- bgcolor="#FFFFFF"
| 
| 16.6 (102)
| 
| 10.13 (73)
| Junction Oval
| 11,000
| 3 July 1937
|- bgcolor="#FFFFFF"
| 
| 11.11 (77)
| 
| 11.22 (88)
| Arden Street Oval
| 6,000
| 3 July 1937

Round 12

|- bgcolor="#CCCCFF"
| Home team
| Home team score
| Away team
| Away team score
| Venue
| Crowd
| Date
|- bgcolor="#FFFFFF"
| 
| 9.15 (69)
| 
| 6.15 (51)
| Glenferrie Oval
| 5,000
| 10 July 1937
|- bgcolor="#FFFFFF"
| 
| 10.19 (79)
| 
| 5.11 (41)
| Brunswick Street Oval
| 14,000
| 10 July 1937
|- bgcolor="#FFFFFF"
| 
| 9.13 (67)
| 
| 11.11 (77)
| Windy Hill
| 11,000
| 10 July 1937
|- bgcolor="#FFFFFF"
| 
| 15.12 (102)
| 
| 13.10 (88)
| Punt Road Oval
| 16,000
| 10 July 1937
|- bgcolor="#FFFFFF"
| 
| 13.16 (94)
| 
| 10.11 (71)
| Corio Oval
| 16,000
| 10 July 1937
|- bgcolor="#FFFFFF"
| 
| 13.9 (87)
| 
| 7.14 (56)
| Lake Oval
| 22,000
| 10 July 1937

Round 13

|- bgcolor="#CCCCFF"
| Home team
| Home team score
| Away team
| Away team score
| Venue
| Crowd
| Date
|- bgcolor="#FFFFFF"
| 
| 11.9 (75)
| 
| 12.6 (78)
| Western Oval
| 10,000
| 17 July 1937
|- bgcolor="#FFFFFF"
| 
| 18.19 (127)
| 
| 15.14 (104)
| Victoria Park
| 22,000
| 17 July 1937
|- bgcolor="#FFFFFF"
| 
| 9.13 (67)
| 
| 13.14 (92)
| Princes Park
| 15,000
| 17 July 1937
|- bgcolor="#FFFFFF"
| 
| 11.15 (81)
| 
| 9.8 (62)
| Junction Oval
| 9,000
| 17 July 1937
|- bgcolor="#FFFFFF"
| 
| 5.17 (47)
| 
| 9.14 (68)
| Arden Street Oval
| 8,000
| 17 July 1937
|- bgcolor="#FFFFFF"
| 
| 11.13 (79)
| 
| 8.15 (63)
| MCG
| 11,449
| 17 July 1937

Round 14

|- bgcolor="#CCCCFF"
| Home team
| Home team score
| Away team
| Away team score
| Venue
| Crowd
| Date
|- bgcolor="#FFFFFF"
| 
| 16.23 (119)
| 
| 13.11 (89)
| Punt Road Oval
| 18,000
| 24 July 1937
|- bgcolor="#FFFFFF"
| 
| 24.20 (164)
| 
| 7.9 (51)
| Victoria Park
| 9,000
| 24 July 1937
|- bgcolor="#FFFFFF"
| 
| 16.24 (120)
| 
| 16.8 (104)
| Princes Park
| 16,000
| 24 July 1937
|- bgcolor="#FFFFFF"
| 
| 17.10 (112)
| 
| 13.15 (93)
| Junction Oval
| 12,000
| 24 July 1937
|- bgcolor="#FFFFFF"
| 
| 10.11 (71)
| 
| 6.13 (49)
| Glenferrie Oval
| 7,500
| 24 July 1937
|- bgcolor="#FFFFFF"
| 
| 13.22 (100)
| 
| 9.12 (66)
| Corio Oval
| 8,000
| 24 July 1937

Round 15

|- bgcolor="#CCCCFF"
| Home team
| Home team score
| Away team
| Away team score
| Venue
| Crowd
| Date
|- bgcolor="#FFFFFF"
| 
| 18.16 (124)
| 
| 11.18 (84)
| MCG
| 25,904
| 31 July 1937
|- bgcolor="#FFFFFF"
| 
| 11.13 (79)
| 
| 15.13 (103)
| Brunswick Street Oval
| 14,000
| 31 July 1937
|- bgcolor="#FFFFFF"
| 
| 11.13 (79)
| 
| 13.14 (92)
| Windy Hill
| 6,000
| 31 July 1937
|- bgcolor="#FFFFFF"
| 
| 13.10 (88)
| 
| 16.11 (107)
| Lake Oval
| 12,000
| 31 July 1937
|- bgcolor="#FFFFFF"
| 
| 10.14 (74)
| 
| 19.12 (126)
| Western Oval
| 10,000
| 31 July 1937
|- bgcolor="#FFFFFF"
| 
| 10.11 (71)
| 
| 14.8 (92)
| Arden Street Oval
| 11,000
| 31 July 1937

Round 16

|- bgcolor="#CCCCFF"
| Home team
| Home team score
| Away team
| Away team score
| Venue
| Crowd
| Date
|- bgcolor="#FFFFFF"
| 
| 8.16 (64)
| 
| 13.13 (91)
| Arden Street Oval
| 8,000
| 7 August 1937
|- bgcolor="#FFFFFF"
| 
| 10.16 (76)
| 
| 15.8 (98)
| Lake Oval
| 10,000
| 7 August 1937
|- bgcolor="#FFFFFF"
| 
| 13.15 (93)
| 
| 12.19 (91)
| Punt Road Oval
| 14,000
| 7 August 1937
|- bgcolor="#FFFFFF"
| 
| 21.16 (142)
| 
| 22.21 (153)
| Victoria Park
| 21,000
| 14 August 1937
|- bgcolor="#FFFFFF"
| 
| 12.16 (88)
| 
| 11.12 (78)
| Princes Park
| 12,000
| 14 August 1937
|- bgcolor="#FFFFFF"
| 
| 13.13 (91)
| 
| 17.12 (114)
| Glenferrie Oval
| 6,000
| 14 August 1937

Round 17

|- bgcolor="#CCCCFF"
| Home team
| Home team score
| Away team
| Away team score
| Venue
| Crowd
| Date
|- bgcolor="#FFFFFF"
| 
| 15.12 (102)
| 
| 10.15 (75)
| Glenferrie Oval
| 6,000
| 21 August 1937
|- bgcolor="#FFFFFF"
| 
| 14.6 (90)
| 
| 8.11 (59)
| Corio Oval
| 11,500
| 21 August 1937
|- bgcolor="#FFFFFF"
| 
| 17.17 (119)
| 
| 10.10 (70)
| Windy Hill
| 7,000
| 21 August 1937
|- bgcolor="#FFFFFF"
| 
| 11.15 (81)
| 
| 9.17 (71)
| Princes Park
| 17,500
| 21 August 1937
|- bgcolor="#FFFFFF"
| 
| 22.19 (151)
| 
| 11.5 (71)
| Junction Oval
| 6,000
| 21 August 1937
|- bgcolor="#FFFFFF"
| 
| 15.15 (105)
| 
| 10.14 (74)
| MCG
| 9,553
| 21 August 1937

Round 18

|- bgcolor="#CCCCFF"
| Home team
| Home team score
| Away team
| Away team score
| Venue
| Crowd
| Date
|- bgcolor="#FFFFFF"
| 
| 12.9 (81)
| 
| 16.13 (109)
| Brunswick Street Oval
| 10,000
| 28 August 1937
|- bgcolor="#FFFFFF"
| 
| 19.15 (129)
| 
| 13.13 (91)
| Victoria Park
| 11,500
| 28 August 1937
|- bgcolor="#FFFFFF"
| 
| 13.13 (91)
| 
| 19.16 (130)
| Arden Street Oval
| 4,500
| 28 August 1937
|- bgcolor="#FFFFFF"
| 
| 14.13 (97)
| 
| 13.14 (92)
| Punt Road Oval
| 18,000
| 28 August 1937
|- bgcolor="#FFFFFF"
| 
| 10.16 (76)
| 
| 11.7 (73)
| Lake Oval
| 6,000
| 28 August 1937
|- bgcolor="#FFFFFF"
| 
| 13.16 (94)
| 
| 17.14 (116)
| Western Oval
| 8,000
| 28 August 1937

Ladder

Finals

Semi finals

|- bgcolor="#CCCCFF"
| Home team
| Score
| Away team
| Score
| Venue
| Crowd
| Date
|- bgcolor="#FFFFFF"
| 
| 18.12 (120)
| 
| 10.9 (69)
| MCG
| 41,663
| 4 September
|- bgcolor="#FFFFFF"
| 
| 19.11 (125)
| 
| 16.17 (113)
| MCG
| 47,730
| 11 September

Preliminary Final

|- bgcolor="#CCCCFF"
| Home team
| Score
| Away team
| Score
| Venue
| Crowd
| Date
|- bgcolor="#FFFFFF"
| 
| 7.10 (52)
| 
| 16.11 (107)
| MCG
| 55,615
| 18 September

Grand final

Geelong defeated Collingwood 18.14 (122) to 12.18 (90), in front of a crowd of 88,540 people. (For an explanation of scoring see Australian rules football).

Awards
 The 1937 VFL Premiership team was Geelong.
 The VFL's leading goalkicker was Dick Harris of Richmond with 64 goals.
 The winner of The Argus' "Player of the Year" was Dick Reynolds of Essendon.
 The winner of the 1937 Brownlow Medal was Dick Reynolds of Essendon with 27 votes.
 North Melbourne took the "wooden spoon" in 1937.
Geelong 12.12 (84) defeated  9.11 (65) in the Grand Final, played as a stand-alone game on Thursday 30 September (Show Day holiday) at the Melbourne Cricket Ground.

Notable events
 Still struggling to recover from the injury that kept him out of the 1936 Grand Final, Bob Pratt only played six matches (kicking 12 goals) for South Melbourne in the 1937 season.
 Having kicked Collingwood's only goal in the last quarter of the Grand Final, Gordon Coventry retired having played 306 senior VFL games and having scored 1299 goals.
 In Round 15, Coventry became the first player to play 300 VFL games
 In Round 16, Collingwood and Melbourne set numerous records for high scoring:
 a record match aggregate of 295 points, beating by two the record of Essendon and North Melbourne in 1934
 highest losing score, beating Collingwood's own record against St. Kilda in 1931 and still a club record for Collingwood

References

Sources
 Atkinson, G. (1982) Everything you ever wanted to know about Australian rules football but couldn't be bothered asking, The Five Mile Press: Melbourne. .
 Rogers, S. & Brown, A., Every Game Ever Played: VFL/AFL Results 1897–1997 (Sixth Edition), Viking Books, (Ringwood), 1998. 
 Ross, J. (ed), 100 Years of Australian Football 1897–1996: The Complete Story of the AFL, All the Big Stories, All the Great Pictures, All the Champions, Every AFL Season Reported, Viking, (Ringwood), 1996.

External links
 1937 Season - AFL Tables

Australian Football League seasons
Vfl season